The 1938 Mississippi State Teachers Yellow Jackets football team was an American football team that represented the Mississippi State Teachers College (now known as the University of Southern Mississippi) as a member of the Southern Intercollegiate Athletic Association during the 1938 college football season. In their second year under head coach Reed Green, the team compiled a 7–2 record.

Schedule

References

Mississippi State Teachers
Southern Miss Golden Eagles football seasons
Mississippi State Teachers Yellow Jackets football